Maxwell Franklin Leslie (24 October 1902 – 26 September 1985) was a naval aviator in the United States Navy during World War II. He is credited with having played a major part in the Battle of Midway.

Early life
Born in Seattle, Washington, on 24 October 1902, Leslie attended the University of Washington before entering the United States Naval Academy in 1922, graduating in 1926, the same class as Carlton Hutchins, Wade McClusky, and Lofton R. Henderson.

Naval career
Leslie was commissioned ensign in 1926, and received flight training at Naval Air Station Pensacola in 1929. He qualified as a naval aviator in 1930. When the United States entered World War II, he was executive officer of Bombing Squadron 3 (VB-3) aboard . He flew with his squadron off , while escorting  on the Doolittle Raid.

Battle of Midway

Leslie was in command of VB-3, operating from  during Midway. Following the Japanese destroyer  that had been counterattacking , Leslie and Lieutenant Commander Wade McClusky, from Enterprise, managed to arrive above the Japanese task force at the precise moment its combat air patrol had been drawn down to the deck to repel Yorktowns torpedo bombers, and at the moment of the First Air Fleet's maximum vulnerability. With the Japanese Zeros too low to be effective, the SBD Dauntlesses of McClusky's squadron of 20 dive bombers and Max Leslie's squadron of 17 dive bombers poured down through the miraculously open sky to unload their bombs on the Japanese carriers, their hangar decks cluttered with confused ranks of recovered and warming up aircraft, snaking fuel hoses, and stacks of munitions from the various rearmament operations. Leslie himself did not have a bomb as it was accidentally released via a faulty electrical arming switch. Nevertheless, he also dived with the rest of the SBDs, strafing carrier decks.

In just five minutes, Enterprises Scouting Squadron Six and Bombing Squadron Six destroyed two Japanese fleet carriers.  was abandoned at 1700 and sank at 1925.  was abandoned just after Kaga went down, and was scuttled before dawn June 5. Leslie and his wingman Lieutenant Junior Grade P.A. Holmberg returned to Yorktown, but as Yorktown was under attack by Japanese planes and their fuel was exhausted, they ditched near the cruiser . Leslie, Holmberg, and their gunners were rescued by one of the cruiser's whaleboats.

A single carrier, which was ten miles to the north of the other three carriers, escaped damage the morning of June 4, but was sunk on June 5. For heroism at the battle, Leslie was awarded the Navy Cross.

Leslie continued to serve overseas during World War II:

Later career and awards
Leslie spent the rest of his career after the war in various ships and shore stations and retired in 1956. In addition to the Navy Cross, he was presented the Bronze Star Medal with combat "V" and the Navy Commendation Ribbon, the Presidential Unit Citation to Enterprise, American Defense Service Medal, Fleet Clasp, American Campaign Medal, Asiatic-Pacific Campaign Medal, World War II Victory Medal and the National Defense Service Medal.

Leslie died in San Diego, California, on 26 September 1985.

In popular culture
Leslie was depicted by Monte Markham in the 1976 film Midway.

References

1902 births
1984 deaths
United States Naval Aviators
United States Navy officers
United States Naval Academy alumni
United States Navy bomber pilots of World War II
Aviators from Washington (state)
Battle of Midway
Recipients of the Navy Cross (United States)